Harmonie was a 40-gun  of the French Navy. Her crew scuttled her on 17 March 1797 to avoid having the Royal Navy capture her. She on being burned was reported as pierced for 44 guns

Career 
On 7 June 1796, Harmonie departed Rochefort to ferry weapons and ammunition to Cap-Français, under Captain Joshua Barney. She then cruised in the Caribbean between Havana and Chesapeake Bay, returning to Cap-Français on 17 October. Lieutenant Simon Billiette took command of Harmonie on 19 August 1796; he was promoted to Commander on 22 September.

In April 1797, Harmonie was ordered to escort a convoy of merchantmen waiting in Jean-Rabel. She departed Cap Français but on 15 April the ships of the line  and  intercepted her. In the ensuing Battle of Jean-Rabel, Harmonie sought refugee in the shallow waters off le Marigot, and the ships of the line departed after firing on her with little effect for several hours  or otherwise reported were struggling to keep station because of the wind. On 16 April, however, the ships returned, and the crew of Harmonie, seeing her hopelessly cornered, scuttled her by burning. Billiette sustained two wounds at the left leg. 

On 20 April, the British ships captured most of the convoy that Harmonie had been tasked to escort. Billiette was court-martialled for the destruction of his frigate, and on 26 April 1798 found innocent of the loss of the ship.

Notes, citations, and references
Notes

Citations

References
 
 
 
  (1671-1870)

Virginie-class frigates
1796 ships
Ships built in France
Maritime incidents in 1797
Ship fires
Naval magazine explosions
Scuttled vessels
Shipwrecks in the Caribbean Sea